Jing Xuezhu (born 20 April 1975) is a Chinese high jumper.

She finished twelfth at the 2003 Universiade and won the silver medal at the 2005 Asian Championships. She also competed at the 2004 Olympic Games without reaching the final round.

References

External links

1975 births
Living people
Chinese female high jumpers
Athletes (track and field) at the 2004 Summer Olympics
Olympic athletes of China
Competitors at the 2003 Summer Universiade